Sitembele Tobela Mzamane (born 30 January 1952) is a South African Anglican bishop. He is a former Bishop of Mthatha, and although the first bishop to bear that title, he is the 10th incumbent, since the bishopric was previously known as St John's.

Biography 

Sitembele was born in Ngxaza, Tsolo, Transkei in 1952. His mother was Cynthia Sylvia Nozipho Dlwati and his father Joab Cornelius Mhlangenqaba Mzamane who was an agriculturalist. Sitembele was married to Hazel Tobeka Gobingca and they have five children, Sibongiseni, Nangamso, Batwa, Notabizolo and Sisonke). His grand father Shadrach Mzamane was also an Anglican lay preacher in the Ngcele area. After receiving a Diploma in Theology from St. Bede's College in Mthatha, Sitembele was ordained to the diaconate in December 1975 and the Priesthood in December 1977.

While Priest in Charge of St. Barnabas Manzana, he completed a Bachelor of Theology degree from the University of South Africa. In 1988 he was appointed rector of St. Peter's, Butterworth, Eastern Cape and archdeacon and served in that position for two years before being appointed dean of St John's Cathedral, Mthatha.

While serving as dean, he completed an honours BA from the University of the Free State (graduating cum laude), an MA from the University of the Free State, and a PhD from the University of Pretoria. In 2013 he received an honorary Doctor of Divinity degree, jure dignitatis from Huron University College.

In 2000, Sitembele was elected bishop of the Diocese of St. John's.

During his episcopacy the number of parishes grew so greatly that Mzamane drafted plans to split the area with a new episcopal see centred at Ngcobo. The new Diocese of Mbhashe was established on 16 December 2010 out of part of the Diocese of Mthatha.

Views 

A former Dean of the diocese's cathedral Mzamane subscribes to the orthodox Anglican stance on homosexuality, and is opposed to the blessing of same-sex relationships.

Notes 

1952 births
Living people
Anglican bishops of St John's
Anglican bishops of Mthatha
21st-century Anglican Church of Southern Africa bishops